Salvador Salguero (born 4 August 1967) is a Salvadoran swimmer. He competed in two events at the 1984 Summer Olympics.

References

1967 births
Living people
Salvadoran male swimmers
Olympic swimmers of El Salvador
Swimmers at the 1984 Summer Olympics
Place of birth missing (living people)